WAIN (1270 kHz) is an AM radio station licensed to Columbia, Kentucky, United States.  The station is currently owned by Forcht Broadcasting.

FM Translator
In addition to the main station at 1270 kHz, WAIN is relayed by an FM translator at 101.9 MHz to widen its broadcast area, especially during nighttime hours when the AM signal broadcasts with only 68 watts.

References

External links

AIN
CBS Sports Radio stations
Columbia, Kentucky